Richard Meggot (died 7 December 1692) was a Canon of Windsor from 1677 to 1692 and Dean of Winchester from 1679 to 1692.

Career
He was educated at Queens' College, Cambridge, where he graduated BA 1653, MA 1657 and DD in 1669.

He was appointed:
Rector of St Olave's Church, Southwark 1662
Vicar of Twickenham 1668–1687
Chaplain in ordinary of King Charles II 1672

He was appointed to the eighth stall in St George's Chapel, Windsor Castle in 1677, and held the stall until 1692.

Notes 

1692 deaths
Canons of Windsor
Deans of Winchester
Alumni of Queens' College, Cambridge
Year of birth missing